A glomectomy is an excision of a glomus body or a glomus cell, usually in the case of a glomus tumor. This operation was formerly performed for the treatment of severe, chronic asthma, but has since been abandoned for this purpose due to its lack of efficacy.

References

Surgery
General surgery